Abattis is an extinct town in Warren County, in the U.S. state of Missouri.

A post office called Abattis was established in 1878, and remained in operation until 1904. It is unclear why the name Abattis was applied to this community.

References

Ghost towns in Missouri
Former populated places in Warren County, Missouri